David Slingsby Ogle  (1921 – 25 May 1962) was a British industrial and car designer. He founded the design consultancy company Ogle Design in 1954.

He was educated at Rugby School and briefly studied law at University of Oxford. In 1940 he joined the Fleet Air Arm. He flew the Supermarine Seafire in operations in North Africa, the Mediterranean, and in the south of France. He rose to the rank of Lt Commander and was awarded the DSC and the MBE.

At the conclusion of the war he attended the Central School of Art and Design in London, studying industrial design. He subsequently joined Murphy Radio. He left Murphy in 1948 to join Bush Radio. It was while at Bush that he was responsible for the iconic design of the TR82 transistor radio.

He went on to design the Ogle SX1000 based on the Mini. Sixty-nine cars were made before David Ogle's death. He also designed the Reliant Scimitar.

Ogle died in an automobile accident on 25 May 1962, while driving an Ogle Mini GT sports car on the way to Brands Hatch race circuit where he was going to demonstrate the vehicle. He was on the A1 highway at Digswell Hill, Welwyn, Hertsfordshire and travelling at  when he collided with a van and the car burst into flames.

Honours and awards
27 March 1945 – For distinguished service and gallantry during the invasion of the South of France, the Distinguished Service Cross (DSC) to Temporary Lieutenant (A) David Slingsby Ogle, RNVR (Reigate).
13 June 1946 – To be a Member of the Order of the British Empire – Lieutenant (A) Davide Slingsby Ogle, DSC, RNVR.

References

1921 births
1962 deaths
People educated at Rugby School
Alumni of the University of Oxford
British World War II pilots
British automobile designers
Members of the Order of the British Empire
Recipients of the Distinguished Service Cross (United Kingdom)
Fleet Air Arm aviators
Road incident deaths in England
British industrial designers
Alumni of the Central School of Art and Design
Fleet Air Arm personnel of World War II